The Mountain Pacific Curling Association (MoPac) is a regional association of the United States Curling Association encompassing the states of Arizona, California, Idaho, Oregon, Montana, Nevada, and Utah.

MoPac sends regional representatives to a number of national competitions, hosting playdowns to determine the representative if there are multiple teams interested. In addition, MoPac has held a 5 & Under Bonspiel annually since 2012 for any curlers of member clubs that have been curling for 5 years or less.

Member Clubs

References

External links 

 Mountain Pacific Curling Association
 United States Curling Association

Curling governing bodies in the United States
Curling in California
Curling in Utah
Curling in Nevada